The International Association for Social Science Information Service and Technology (or IASSIST) is an international organisation that provides professional development, communication and conferences for data librarians, archivists, and social science aligned information specialists.

Each year the IASSIST Fellow program sponsors members from developing nations to attend events and professional development to further the advancement of information management.

Conferences

History
The first IASSIST conference was held in 1977 in Cocoa Beach, Florida
 with 29 representatives from Canada and the United States.

IASSIST Quarterly (IQ)
The IASSIST Quarterly (ISSN: 0739-1137) is a peer-reviewed, indexed, open access quarterly journal of articles dealing with social science information and data services. IQ represents an international cooperative effort on the part of individuals managing, operating, or using machine-readable data archives, data libraries, and data services. The IQ is published by the IASSIST and hosted by the University of Alberta Libraries.

References

Social sciences